Alice May Roberts  (born 19 May 1973) is an English biological anthropologist, biologist, television presenter and author. Since 2012 she has been professor of the Public Engagement in Science at the University of Birmingham. She was president of the charity Humanists UK between January 2019 and May 2022. She is now a vice president of the organisation.

Early life and education 
Roberts was born in Bristol in 1973, the daughter of an aeronautical engineer and an English and arts teacher. She grew up in the Bristol suburb of Westbury-on-Trym where she attended The Red Maids' School. In December 1988, she won the BBC1 Blue Peter Young Artists competition, appearing with her picture and the presenters on the front cover of the 10 December 1988 edition of the Radio Times.

Roberts studied medicine at the University of Wales College of Medicine (now part of Cardiff University) and graduated in 1997 with a Bachelor of Medicine, Bachelor of Surgery (MB BCh) degree, having gained an intercalated Bachelor of Science degree in Anatomy.

Research and career

After graduating, Roberts worked as a junior doctor with the National Health Service in South Wales for 18 months. In 1998 she left clinical medicine and worked as an anatomy demonstrator at the University of Bristol, becoming a lecturer there in 1999.

She spent seven years working part-time on her PhD in paleopathology, receiving the degree in 2008. She was a senior teaching fellow at the University of Bristol Centre for Comparative and Clinical Anatomy, where her main roles were teaching clinical anatomy, embryology and physical anthropology, as well as researching osteoarchaeology and paleopathology. She stated in 2009 that she was working towards becoming a professor of anatomy.

In 2009 she co-presented modules for the Beating Bipolar programme, the first internet-based education treatment for patients with bipolar depression, trialled by Cardiff University researchers.

From August 2009 until January 2012, Roberts was a visiting fellow in both the Department of Archaeology and Anthropology and the Department of Anatomy of the University of Bristol.
From 2009 to 2016 Roberts was Director of Anatomy at the NHS Severn Deanery School of Surgery and also an honorary fellow at Hull York Medical School.

In February 2012 Roberts was appointed the University of Birmingham's first Professor of Public Engagement in Science.

Roberts has been a member of the advisory board of Cheltenham Science Festival for 10 years and a member of the Advisory Board of the Milner Centre for Evolution at the University of Bath since 2018.

Writing in the i newspaper in 2016, Roberts dismissed the aquatic ape hypothesis (AAH) as a distraction "from the emerging story of human evolution that is more interesting and complex", adding that AAH has become "a theory of everything" that is simultaneously "too extravagant and too simple". She concluded by saying that "science is about evidence, not wishful thinking".

Roberts and Aoife McLysaght co-presented the 2018 Royal Institution Christmas Lectures in London. She was president of the British Science Association for the year 2019–2020.

In January 2021 Roberts presented a 10-part narrative history series about the human body entitled Bodies on BBC Radio 4.

Television career 
A presenter of science and history television documentaries, Roberts was one of the regular co-presenters of BBC geographical and environmental series Coast.

Roberts first appeared on television in the Time Team Live 2001 episode, working on Anglo-Saxon burials at Breamore, Hampshire. She served as a bone specialist and general presenter in many episodes, including the spin-off series Extreme Archaeology. In August 2006, a Time Team special episode Big Royal Dig investigated archaeology of Britain's royal palaces; Roberts was one of the main presenters.

Roberts wrote and presented a BBC Two series on anatomy and health entitled Dr Alice Roberts: Don't Die Young, which was broadcast from January 2007. She presented a five-part series on human evolution and early human migrations for that channel entitled The Incredible Human Journey, beginning on 10 May 2009. In September 2009, she co-presented (with Mark Hamilton) A Necessary Evil?, a one-hour documentary about the Burke and Hare murders.

In August 2010, she presented a one-hour documentary on BBC Four, Wild Swimming, inspired by Roger Deakin's book Waterlog. Roberts presented a four-part BBC Two series on archaeology in August–September 2010, Digging for Britain. Roberts explained, "We're taking a fresh approach by showing British archaeology as it's happening out in the field, from the excitement of artefacts as they come out of the ground, through to analysing them in the lab and working out what they tell us about human history." The series returned in 2011 and again (on BBC Four) in 2015, 2016, 2017, 2018, 2019, 2020, 2022 and 2023.

In March 2011, she presented a BBC documentary in the Horizon series entitled Are We Still Evolving? She presented the series Origins of Us, which aired on BBC Two in October 2011, examining how the human body has adapted through seven million years of evolution. The last part of this series featured Roberts visiting the Rift Valley in East Africa.

In April 2012, Roberts presented Woolly Mammoth: Secrets from the Ice on BBC Two. From 22 to 24 October 2012, she appeared, with co-presenter Dr George McGavin, in the BBC series Prehistoric Autopsy, which discussed the remains of early hominins such as Neanderthals, Homo erectus and Australopithecus afarensis. In May and June 2013 she presented the BBC Two series Ice Age Giants. In September 2014, she was a presenter on the Horizon programme Is Your Brain Male or Female?

In October 2014, she presented Spider House. In 2015, she co-presented a 3-part BBC TV documentary with Neil Oliver entitled The Celts: Blood, Iron and Sacrifice and wrote a book to tie in with the series: The Celts: Search for a Civilisation. In April–May 2016, she co-presented the BBC Two programme Food Detectives which looked at food nutrition and its effects on the body. In August 2016, she presented the BBC Four documentary Britain's Pompeii: A Village Lost in Time, which explored the Must Farm Bronze Age settlement in Cambridgeshire. In May 2017, she was a presenter of the BBC Two documentary The Day The Dinosaurs Died. In April 2018, she presented the six-part Channel 4 series Britain's Most Historic Towns, which examines the history of British towns, which was followed by a second series in May 2019 and a third series in November 2020.

In September 2018, she presented the BBC Two documentary King Arthur's Britain: The Truth Unearthed, which examines new archaeological discoveries that cast light on the political and trading situation in Britain during the Early Middle Ages. In December 2018, she presented a series of three Royal Institution Christmas Lectures, titled Who am I? and broadcast on BBC Four, with guest lecturer Aoife McLysaght.

On 4 August 2020, Roberts was the guest on BBC Radio 4's The Life Scientific.

Aired as a three-part series in September 2020, Roberts co-presented the BBC's The Big Dig focusing on the finds at St. James's Park in London and Park Street in Birmingham.

On 12 February 2021, Roberts presented a one-hour BBC Two documentary, Stonehenge: The Lost Circle Revealed, about Mike Parker Pearson's five-year-long quest that filled in a 400-year historical gap in the provenance of the bluestones of Stonehenge and Waun Mawn.

Awards and honours
In 2011, Roberts was elected an honorary fellow of the British Science Association, and a fellow of the Royal Society of Biology. In 2014, she was selected by the Science Council as one of their leading UK practising scientists. During 2014, she was President of The Association for Science Education, and presented the Morgan-Botti lecture.

Roberts has received honorary doctorates (DSc) from Royal Holloway, University of London; Bournemouth University; the Open University and the University of Leeds; honorary Doctor of Medicine (MD) from the University of Sussex; and honorary Doctor of Education from the University of Bath.

In 2019, she was awarded an Honorary Fellowship by Cardiff University.

Roberts was awarded British Humanist of the Year 2015, for work promoting the teaching of evolution in schools.

The Incredible Unlikeliness of Being was shortlisted for the Wellcome Book Prize 2015.

In 2020, Roberts won the Royal Society David Attenborough Award and Lecture.

On 22 May 2022, Roberts unveiled the Statue of Mary Anning at Lyme Regis; the statue was the result of a crowdfunded campaign ("Mary Anning Rocks") to commisison and display a statue to the paleontologist Mary Anning in Lyme Regis.

Personal life

Roberts lives with her husband, David Stevens, and two children, a daughter born in 2010 and a son born in 2013. She met her husband in Cardiff in 1995 when she was a medical student and he was an archaeology student. They married in 2009.

She is a pescatarian, an atheist and former president of Humanists UK, beginning her three and a half year term in January 2019. She is now a vice president of the organisation. Her children were assigned a faith school due to over-subscription of her local community schools; she campaigns against state-funded religious schools, citing her story as an example of the problems perpetuated by faith schools.

Roberts enjoys watercolour painting, surfing, wild swimming, cycling, gardening and pub quizzes. Roberts is an organiser of the Cheltenham Science Festival and school outreach programmes within the University of Bristol's Medical Sciences Division. In March 2007, she hosted the Bristol Medical School's charity dance show Clicendales 2007, to raise funds for the charity CLIC Sargent.

Roberts took her baby daughter with her when touring for the six-month filming of the first series of Digging for Britain in 2010.

Publications
Roberts is an author. She has authored or co-authored a number of peer reviewed scientific articles in journals. Her published books include:

 
 
 
  
 
  Revised edition (2018), Dorling Kindersley, 
 Human anatomy: the definitive visual guide. Dorling Kindersley, 2014. , 
 
 
 
 

Buried: An alternative history of the first millennium in Britain. Simon & Schuster UK. 2022.

References

External links 

 
 
 
 

1973 births
Living people
20th-century atheists
21st-century atheists
20th-century English medical doctors
21st-century British women scientists
21st-century English women writers
Academics of the University of Bristol
Academics of the University of Birmingham
Alumni of Cardiff University
English anthropologists
English atheists
English humanists
English television presenters
National Health Service people
Paleopathologists
Women pathologists
People educated at The Red Maids' School
Scientists from Bristol
Archaeologists appearing on Time Team
English women medical doctors
English women scientists
Television personalities from Bristol
People from Westbury-on-Trym
20th-century women physicians
Fellows of the Royal Society of Biology
English archaeologists
British women archaeologists
Bioarchaeologists
20th-century English women
20th-century English people
21st-century English women
21st-century English people